Tyresö may refer to:

Places 
 Tyresö Municipality, municipality in Stockholm County, Sweden

 Tyresö Palace, palace in Tyresö Municipality, Stockholm County, Sweden
 Tyresö Centrum, an enclosed shopping centre in Bollmora, Tyresö Municipality, Stockholm County, Sweden

Other uses 
 Tyresö FF, Swedish football club from Tyresö Municipality, Stockholm County, Sweden
 Tyresö HF, Swedish women's handball club from Tyresö Municipality, Stockholm County, Sweden